The following is a list of Washington Huskies softball seasons. The University of Washington is a member of the Pac-12 Conference of the NCAA Division I.  The Huskies have won four conference championships, appeared in the NCAA Division I softball tournament 36 times, and in the Women's College World Series 14 times.  The Huskies won the National Championship in 2009, and appeared in the finals three more times.

Season results

References

Washington
Washington Huskies softball